Fathi Jabir  (Arabic: فتحي جابر ) (born 29 December 1980) is a Yemeni football striker and Club Al-Tilal، Yemen's top scorer the season: 1998/99

Honours

Club
Al-Tilal'

Yemeni League: 1
 2005
Yemeni Presidents Cup: 1
2007
Yemeni Naseem Cup: 2
2000, 2003
Yemeni Unity Cup: 1
1999
Yemeni Ali Muhsin al-Murisi Cup: 1
2003

External links 
 

1980 births
Living people
Yemeni footballers
Yemen international footballers
Association football forwards
Al-Tilal SC players
Yemeni League players